Elections to Dungannon District Council were held on 30 May 1973 on the same day as the other Northern Irish local government elections. The election used four district electoral areas to elect a total of 20 councillors.

Election results

Districts summary

|- class="unsortable" align="centre"
!rowspan=2 align="left"|Ward
! % 
!Cllrs
! % 
!Cllrs
! %
!Cllrs
! %
!Cllrs
!rowspan=2|TotalCllrs
|- class="unsortable" align="center"
!colspan=2 bgcolor="" | UUP
!colspan=2 bgcolor="" | SDLP
!colspan=2 bgcolor="" | Unity
!colspan=2 bgcolor="white"| Others
|-
|align="left"|Area A
|bgcolor="40BFF5"|52.8
|bgcolor="40BFF5"|3
|19.8
|2
|22.3
|1
|5.1
|0
|5
|-
|align="left"|Area B
|27.4
|1
|bgcolor="#99FF66"|35.0
|bgcolor="#99FF66"|2
|7.2
|0
|30.4
|2
|5
|-
|align="left"|Area C
|bgcolor="40BFF5"|67.0
|bgcolor="40BFF5"|4
|16.3
|1
|3.7
|0
|13.0
|0
|5
|-
|align="left"|Area D
|bgcolor="40BFF5"|52.3
|bgcolor="40BFF5"|3
|15.4
|1
|7.7
|1
|24.6
|0
|5
|-
|- class="unsortable" class="sortbottom" style="background:#C9C9C9"
|align="left"| Total
|50.2
|11
|21.6
|5
|10.1
|2
|18.1
|2
|20
|-
|}

Districts results

Area A

1973: 3 x UUP, 1 x SDLP, 1 x Unity

Area B

1973: 2 x SDLP, 2 x Independent Republican, 1 x UUP

Area C

1973: 4 x UUP, 1 x SDLP

Area D

1973: 3 x UUP, 1 x SDLP, 1 x Unity

References

Dungannon and South Tyrone Borough Council elections
Dungannon and South Tyrone